In Portugal, a public holiday is a calendar date, legally recognised and defined in the Labour Code as well as the Concordat of 2004, on which most businesses and non-essential services are closed. On some of these dates, public commemorative festivities are traditionally held.

Public holidays in Portugal are a mixture of select religious (Roman Catholic) observances and days that have national historical or cultural significance. These dates have changed over time: currently, there are 13 mandatory holidays and one optional (Carnival) that has to be specifically designated as a day off work each year by government decree (for public servants) or companies (for private sector). Specific dates may alternatively be observed only at region or municipal level. Collective bargaining can specify that optional holidays are observed always and are also free for agreeing other dates that the specific company or sector agrees to observe as a holiday (e.g. bank holidays).

Public holidays in Portugal

Revoked holidays in 2013–2015
In 2012, the Coalition government of Pedro Passos Coelho controversially revoked four holidays – two civilian holidays (Republic Day and Restoration of Independence) and two religious ones (Corpus Christi and All Saints Day). The move was effective from 2013 onwards and was presented as a measure to increase productivity, in the context of the 2011–2014 Troika bailout to Portugal (even though that measure was never requested by the Memorandum of Understanding). Public debate and re-evaluation were scheduled in 2018 for the religious holidays.

The four holidays were eventually restored by the government of António Costa, in January 2016.

Local holidays
According to a Decree of 12 October 1910, municipalities were given the possibility of choosing a day that would represent their traditional festivals.

References

External links
 Religious Festivals in Madeira 2014
 Madeira Events 2014

 
Portugal
Holidays
Portuguese culture
Observances in Portugal